Azizabad (also Romanized as ‘Azīzābād) is a village in Zavkuh Rural District, Pishkamar District, Kalaleh County, Golestan Province, Iran. At the 2006 census, its population was 1,446, in 305 families.

References 

Populated places in Kalaleh County